Lima is a Portuguese language surname.

 Adriana Lima (born 1981), Brazilian model
 Ana Clara Lima (born 1997), Brazilian television presenter and reporter
 Antônio Lima dos Santos (born 1942), known as Lima, Brazilian international footballer
 Brian Lima (born 1972), Samoan rugby union player
 Devin Lima (1977–2018), American singer, member of the band LFO
 Douglas Lima (born 1988), Brazilian mixed martial artist
 Elon Lages Lima (1929–2017), Brazilian mathematician
 Fernanda Lima (born 1977), Brazilian actress
 Floriana Lima, American actress
 Francisco Lima (born 1971), footballer
 Guilherme Natan de Lima (born 1999), known as Lima, Brazilian footballer
 Jeff Lima, New Zealand rugby league player
 João Maria Lima do Nascimento (born 1982), known as Lima, Brazilian footballer
 José Lima (1972–2010), Dominican baseball player
 José-Filipe Lima (born 1981), Portuguese European Tour golfer
 Maurício Lima (born 1968), Brazilian volleyball player
 Pedro Lima (swimmer) (born 1971), former Olympic swimmer from Angola
 Pedro Lima (boxer) (born 1983), Brazilian boxer
 Peter Lima, Samoan rugby league footballer
 Ricarda Lima (born 1970), Brazilian volleyball player
 Rodrigo José Lima dos Santos (born 1983), Brazilian footballer
 Rodrigo Lima (fighter) (born 1991), Brazilian mixed martial artist
 Rodrigo Lima (born 1999), Cape Verdean footballer
 Rossy Evelin Lima (born 1989), Mexican-American poet and professor
 Salvatore Lima (1928–1992), Italian politician, see also the Mafia
 Steven Lima, American politician
 Vanderlei de Lima (born 1969), Brazilian marathon runner
 Luis Augusto Turcios Lima (1941-1966), was a Guatemalan army officer and leader of the Rebel Armed Forces (Fuerzas Armadas Rebeldes, or FAR).
 Vicente Solano Lima (1901-1984), was a moderately conservative newspaper publisher and politician who served as Vice President of Argentina from May 25, 1973 to July 13, 1973.
 Venceslau de Lima (1858-1919), was a Portuguese geologist, paleontologist, viticulturist, and politician who, among other functions, served as a member of Parliament, a minister, and as President of the Council of Ministers (now Prime Minister).
 Nehemia De Lima (1882-1940), was a banker and leader of the Zionist and socialist Dutchman . Bank Hapoalim founder of the Netherlands, "De Zentrale" (De Centrale Arbeiders Verzekerings) and director of the Jewish National Fund (JNF) in 1919-1921. 
 Joseph Suasso Lima (1791–1858), South African writer and journalist.
 Frank Lima (1939-2013), was an American poet most closely associated with the New York School.
 José Lezama Lima (1910-1976), was a Cuban novelist, essayist and poet, is considered one of the most influential figures in Latin American literature.
 Frank De Lima (born July 8, 1949), an American comedian from Hawaii. He is of Portuguese, Hawaiian, Irish, Chinese, English, Spanish, and Scottish descent. 
 Manolo Lima (1919-1990), known in the field of painting as Manolo Lima , was a painter and teacher Uruguay.

It is also the main surname of three Brazilian footballers who are better known by other names:

 Daniela Alves Lima (born 1984)
 Ronaldo Luís Nazário de Lima (born 1976)
 Sisleide do Amor Lima (born 1967), better known as Sissi

Portuguese-language surnames